Three ships of the Royal Navy have borne the name HMS Exe, after the River Exe:

  was a  launched in 1903 and sold in 1920.
  was a fishery protection gunboat launched in 1918 as the trawler HMS Thomas Jarvis and renamed Exe in September 1920. She was sold in 1928.
  was a  launched in 1942 and scrapped in 1956.

Royal Navy ship names